Adobes, Texas was a small farming community and now-ghost town, located on the Rio Grande and Farm Road 170. It was founded in the 1870s. Cotton began to be grown in the area in 1914, and by 1930 the community had  of irrigated land.

References

External links
 

Ghost towns in Texas
Unincorporated communities in Presidio County, Texas
Unincorporated communities in Texas